Elly Vilhjálms (1935-1995), more properly known as Henný Eldey Vilhjálmsdóttir', was an Icelandic singer. 

She performed with her brother Vilhjálmur Vilhjálmsson.

References

1935 births
1995 deaths
Elly Vilhjálms
Elly Vilhjálms